Precocious Youth is a 1957 West German drama film directed by Josef von Báky and starring Heidi Brühl, Christian Doermer and Christian Wolff.

The film's sets were designed by Emil Hasler and Paul Markwitz.

Cast
 Heidi Brühl as Inge
 Christian Doermer as Wolfgang
 Christian Wolff as Freddy
 Jochen Brockmann as Vikar Englert
 Paul Esser as Herr Messmann
 Richard Häussler as Herr Rau
 Ilse Fürstenberg as Frau Messmann
 Peter Kraus as Guenther
 Sabine Sinjen as Hannelore
 Harald Dietl as Heini
 Harry Wüstenhagen as Abteilungsleiter Hennig
 Jürgen Graf as Butzi
 Cathrin Heyer as Helga
 Claus Peter Lüttgen as Jochen
 Peter Nijinskij as Jonny
 Walter Koch as Kalle
 Adalbert Gausche as Josef Andretzki

References

Bibliography 
 Bock, Hans-Michael & Bergfelder, Tim. The Concise CineGraph. Encyclopedia of German Cinema. Berghahn Books, 2009.
 Hake, Sabine. German National Cinema. Routledge, 2002.

External links 
 

1957 films
German teen drama films
German coming-of-age drama films
West German films
1950s German-language films
Films directed by Josef von Báky
1950s teen drama films
1950s coming-of-age drama films
1957 drama films
1950s German films